Rockford Township may refer to:

 Rockford Township, Winnebago County, Illinois
 Rockford Township, Floyd County, Iowa
 Rockford Township, Pottawattamie County, Iowa
 Rockford Township, Sedgwick County, Kansas
 Rockford Township, Wright County, Minnesota
 Rockford Township, Caldwell County, Missouri
 Rockford Township, Carroll County, Missouri
 Rockford Township, Gage County, Nebraska
 Rockford Township, Surry County, North Carolina
 Rockford Township, Renville County, North Dakota, in Renville County, North Dakota
 Rockford Township, Perkins County, South Dakota, in Perkins County, South Dakota

Township name disambiguation pages